Bronwen Webster (born Bronwen Saunders; August 2, 1978) is a Canadian curler from Alberta.

Career
Webster won her provincial junior championship earning her a right to represent Alberta at the 1998 Canadian Junior Curling Championships. Her team finished with a 5-7 record.

After playing with Heather Rankin at the 2001 Olympic Trials, Webster would skip her own team again and play with Crystal Rumberg and participate in numerous Alberta Provincial Championships.

Webster joined the Olympic bronze-medalist Shannon Kleibrink rink in 2006 as the second on the team. Webster won her first provincial title as a member of the Kleibrink team in 2008.

She married Kevin Webster in August 2008. 

At the 2011 Canada Cup of Curling, it was announced that Webster, who is expecting her first child, will sit out for the rest of the season following the event. She was replaced by Carolyn McRorie, who had previously filled in for Shannon Kleibrink at the beginning of the season, and Chelsea Matson who did not participate in the Canada Cup event.

Webster left the team in 2014.

External links
 

1978 births
Curlers from Calgary
Living people
Canadian women curlers
Continental Cup of Curling participants
Canada Cup (curling) participants